Tri-state area is an informal term in the United States which can be used for any of several populated areas associated with a particular town or metropolis that, with adjacent suburbs, lies across three states. Some of these involve a state boundary tripoint. Other tri-state areas have a more diffuse population that shares a connected economy and geography—especially with respect to geology, botany, or climate. The term "tri-state area" is often present in radio, television commercials and some movies.

Tri-state areas
 The Cincinnati metropolitan area, including Ohio, Kentucky, and Indiana.
 The area surrounding New York City, which includes parts of New York, New Jersey, and Connecticut. See New York metropolitan area, which sometimes includes part of Pennsylvania as a fourth state.
 The Philadelphia metropolitan area, which covers parts of the states of Pennsylvania, New Jersey, and Delaware and a portion of Maryland's eastern shore.
 The Greater Boston metropolitan area, which covers parts of the states of Massachusetts, Rhode Island, and New Hampshire.
 The Providence metropolitan area covers nearly all of Rhode Island and Bristol County, Massachusetts; though Connecticut is not included in any official definitions of the metropolitan area, three of Rhode Island's five counties border Connecticut.
 The Pittsburgh tri-state area, covering parts of Pennsylvania, Ohio, and West Virginia.
 The Erie, Pennsylvania, tri-state area includes portions of New York and Ohio.
 The Minisink Valley tri-state region, which covers Orange County, New York; Sussex County, New Jersey; and Pike County, Pennsylvania.
 The Chicago tri-state area, or Chicagoland, includes northeast Illinois, Northwest Indiana, and southeast Wisconsin. Parts of southwest Michigan in the Michiana region are also culturally tied to Chicago. The Tri-State Tollway connects Illinois' portion of Chicagoland with Northwest Indiana and southeast Wisconsin.
 The Greater Memphis area or Mid-South, includes West Tennessee, Northwest Mississippi, and the Arkansas delta.
 The Dubuque, Iowa tri-state area spills over into Illinois and Wisconsin.
 The La Crosse, Wisconsin, tri-state area includes La Crosse and Onalaska in Wisconsin; La Crescent, Hokah, and Brownsville in Minnesota; and New Albin and Lansing in Iowa.
 The Chattanooga, Tennessee, tri-state area includes portions of Alabama and Georgia.
 The area that includes Washington, D.C. and the nearby parts of Maryland and Virginia is sometimes loosely referred to as a "tri-state area," although the District of Columbia is not a state. However, with the presence of Jefferson County, West Virginia, in the official Washington–Arlington–Alexandria metropolitan statistical area, the region, as defined by the US Government, does in fact include three states (Maryland, Virginia, West Virginia). Traditionally, however, West Virginia was not considered part of this region, and is therefore not part of the colloquial term used to refer to this area: "the DMV" (DC, Maryland, Virginia).
 ...which is not to be confused with the Delmarva area, which includes Delaware and the eastern shores of Maryland and Virginia. 
 The "Joplin District", a lead and zinc mining region of Oklahoma, Kansas, and Missouri, produces mineral specimens known as "tri-state" minerals, typically consisting mainly of sphalerite.
 The Wiregrass Region includes Southeast Alabama, Southern Georgia, and the Florida Panhandle.
 The Sioux City metropolitan area region of Iowa, Nebraska, and South Dakota.
 Northwest Litchfield County, Connecticut, southern Berkshire County, Massachusetts, and eastern Dutchess County, New York are referred to as a tri-state area or sometimes the "tri-corners".
 The Keokuk, Iowa tri-state area includes parts of Iowa, Missouri, and Illinois.
 The Quincy, Illinois tri-state region includes parts of southeastern Iowa, northwestern Missouri, and western Illinois.
 The Illinois–Indiana–Kentucky tri-state area includes Evansville, Indiana, and adjacent parts of Illinois and Kentucky.
 The Huntington–Ashland metropolitan area incorporates towns in ten counties in Kentucky, Ohio, and West Virginia. This area is sometimes referred to as “Kyova”, a portmanteau of the state abbreviations.
 The Ark-La-Tex is a socio-economic tri-state region that includes thirty-nine counties/parishes in Arkansas, Louisiana, and Texas.
 The Inland Northwest, historically and alternatively known as the Inland Empire includes Washington, Idaho, and Oregon. 

The areas around Quincy, Keokuk, Evansville, Sioux City, and Huntington–Ashland are noteworthy for the states included all being separated by rivers.

Tripoints

Land
Of the 62 points in the United States where three and only three states meet (each of which may be associated with its own tri-state area), 35 are on dry land and 27 are in water. Of the 27 points on water, 3 of them are in the Great Lakes, and thus have no land nearby.

Water

Regions with no tripoint

The following tri-state areas are also notable, but have no tripoint:

See also
 Four Corners
 Four State Area
 Twin cities (geographical proximity), which includes tri-city
 Quad cities
 Three-Country Cairn

References

External links
Tripoint Guide

Geography of the United States
Borders of U.S. states
Border-related lists
Border tripoints